In statistics, a Kaniadakis distribution (also known as κ-distribution) is a statistical distribution that emerges from the Kaniadakis statistics. There are several families of Kaniadakis distributions related to different constraints used in the maximization of the Kaniadakis entropy, such as the κ-Exponential distribution, κ-Gaussian distribution, Kaniadakis κ-Gamma distribution and κ-Weibull distribution. The κ-distributions have been applied for modeling a vast phenomenology of experimental statistical distributions in natural or artificial complex systems, such as, in epidemiology, quantum statistics, in astrophysics and cosmology, in geophysics, in economy, in machine learning.

The κ-distributions are written as function of the κ-deformed exponential, taking the form

enables the power-law description of complex systems following the consistent κ-generalized statistical theory., where  is the Kaniadakis κ-exponential function.

The κ-distribution becomes the common Boltzmann distribution at low energies, while it has a power-law tail at high energies, the feature of high interest of many researchers.

List of κ-statistical distributions

Supported on the whole real line 

 The Kaniadakis Gaussian distribution, also called the κ-Gaussian distribution. The normal distribution is a particular case when 
 The Kaniadakis double exponential distribution, as known as Kaniadakis κ-double exponential distribution or κ-Laplace distribution. The Laplace distribution is a particular case when

Supported on semi-infinite intervals, usually [0,∞) 

 The Kaniadakis Exponential distribution, also called the κ-Exponential distribution. The exponential distribution is a particular case when 
 The Kaniadakis Gamma distribution, also called the κ-Gamma distribution, which is a four-parameter deformation of the generalized Gamma distribution.  
 The κ-Gamma distribution becomes a ...
 κ-Exponential distribution of Type I when .
 κ-Erlang distribution when  and  positive integer.
 Generalized Gamma distribution, when ;
 In the limit , the κ-Gamma distribution becomes a ...
 Erlang distribution, when  and  positive integer;
 Chi-Squared distribution, when  and  half integer;
 Chi distribution, when  and  half integer;

Common Kaniadakis distributions

κ-Exponential distribution

κ-Gaussian distribution

κ-Gamma distribution

κ-Weibull distribution

κ-Logistic distribution

κ-Erlang distribution

κ-Distribution Type IV 

The Kaniadakis distribution of Type IV (or κ-Distribution Type IV) is a three-parameter family of continuous statistical distributions.

The κ-Distribution Type IV distribution has the following probability density function:

 

The cumulative distribution function of κ-Distribution Type IV assumes the form:

 

The κ-Distribution Type IV does not admit a classical version, since the probability function and its cumulative reduces to zero in the classical limit .

Its moment of order  given by

 

See also 

 Giorgio Kaniadakis
 Kaniadakis statistics
 Kaniadakis κ-Exponential distribution
 Kaniadakis κ-Gaussian distribution
 Kaniadakis κ-Gamma distribution
 Kaniadakis κ-Weibull distribution
 Kaniadakis κ-Logistic distribution
 Kaniadakis κ-Erlang distribution

References

External links
Giorgio Kaniadakis Google Scholar page
Kaniadakis Statistics on arXiv.org

Statistics